Alexander Wong is a professor in the Department of Systems Design Engineering and a Co-Director of the Vision and Image Processing Research Group at the University of Waterloo. He is the Canada Research Chair in Artificial Intelligence and Medical Imaging,.. a Founding Member of the Waterloo Artificial Intelligence Institute and a Member of the College of the Royal Society of Canada. and a Fellow of the Institute of Engineering and Technology.

Education 
Wong was educated at the University of Waterloo, where he holds a BSc in computer engineering, a MSc degree in Electrical and Computer Engineering, and a PhD in systems design engineering. He held an NSERC postdoctoral research fellowship at Sunnybrook Health Sciences Centre, Ontario Canada.

Career 
Wong has authored and co-authored over 600 scientific articles and holds over 30 patents and patent applications in various fields ranging from computational imaging to artificial intelligence, and computer vision to multimedia systems. Wong is particularly noted for his significant research contributions in quantitative explainable AI (XAI), trust quantification, automatic machine learning (AutoML), and computational imaging methods such as correlated diffusion imaging

Selected publications

See also
 List of University of Waterloo people

References

External links
 Website
 

Canadian scientists
Canadian people of Chinese descent
University of Waterloo alumni

Year of birth missing (living people)
Living people